Kumargarm Assembly constituency is an assembly constituency in Alipurduar district in the Indian state of West Bengal. It is reserved for scheduled tribes.

Overview
As per orders of the Delimitation Commission, No. 10 Kumargram (ST) covers Kumargram community development block and Bhatibari, Kohinoor, Mahakalguri Parokata, Samuktala, Tatpara I and Turturi gram panchayats in Alipurduar II community development block.

Kumargram Assembly constituency is part of No. 2  Alipurduars (Lok Sabha constituency) (ST).

Members of Legislative Assembly
List of members of Legislative Assembly:

Election results

2021

In the 2021 West Bengal Legislative Assembly election, Manoj Kumar Oraon of BJP defeated his nearest rival Leos Kujur of TMC.

2016

In the 2016 West Bengal Legislative Assembly election, James Kujur of TMC defeated his nearest rival Manoj Kumar Oraon of RSP.

2014 Bye election

In the bye-elections held in 2014, Manoj Kumar Oraon of RSP defeated Joachim Baxla of AITC by 2,667 votes.

2011

In the 2011 West Bengal Legislative Assembly election, Dasrath Tirkey of RSP defeated his nearest rival Joachim Baxla of Trinamool Congress.

1977-2006
Contests in most years were multi cornered but only winners and runners are being mentioned. In the 2006 and 2001 state assembly elections, Dasrath Tirkey of RSP defeated Swapan Kujur and Paresh Chandra Das respectively, both  Trinamool Congress. Salib Toppo of RSP defeated Krishna Chik Baraik of Congress in 1996 and Dudsai Topp of Congress in 1991. Subodh Oraon of RSP defeated Khagendra Nath Thakur of Congress in 1987. Subodh Oraon of RSP defeated Dutsai Toppo of Congress in 1982. John Arther Baxla of RSP defeated Konda Bhagat of Congress in 1977.

1967-1972
Debabrata Chatterjee of Congress won in 1972. Pijush Kanti Mukherjee of Congress won in 1971, 1969 and 1967. Prior to that the Kumargram seat was not there. In 1962 and 1957, Pijush Kanti Mukherjee of Congress won from the Alipurduars Assembly constituency. In independent India's first election in 1951, Alipurduars was a joint seat. Pijush Kanti Mukherjee and Dhirandra Nath Brahma Mandal won from there.

References

Assembly constituencies of West Bengal
Politics of Alipurduar district